Ptilothyris is a genus of moth in the family Lecithoceridae.

Species
 Ptilothyris aglaocrossa Meyrick, 1935
 Ptilothyris brachysema Meyrick, 1938
 Ptilothyris climacista Meyrick, 1926
 Ptilothyris crocophracta Meyrick, 1938
 Ptilothyris crossoceros Meyrick, 1934
 Ptilothyris loxocasis Meyrick, 1938
 Ptilothyris nausicaa Meyrick, 1926
 Ptilothyris nemophorella Ghesquière, 1940
 Ptilothyris neuroplaca (Meyrick, 1933)
 Ptilothyris porphyrea Ghesquière, 1940
 Ptilothyris purpurea Walsingham, 1897
 Ptilothyris serangota Meyrick, 1932

References

Natural History Museum Lepidoptera genus database

 
Lecithoceridae
Moth genera